Rubye Rose Blevins (October 30, 1908 – May 3, 1996), known professionally as Patsy Montana, was an American country music singer and songwriter. Montana was the first female country performer to have a million-selling single with her signature song "I Want to Be a Cowboy's Sweetheart", and is a member of the Country Music Hall of Fame.

Biography
Ruby Blevins (she added an "e" to Ruby in her late teens) was born in Beaudry, Arkansas, United States, and grew up near Hope. She had ten siblings, all of them boys, However, two died early from an accidental fire.

In 1929, Blevins went to California to study violin at the University of the West (now UCLA). She won a local talent contest with her singing, yodelling, and playing the guitar and first prize was an opportunity to play on the Hollywood Breakfast Club radio program.

In the summer of 1933, Blevins went with two of her brothers to the Chicago World's Fair. The trip's mission was to enter a large, prize watermelon the Blevins had raised, and Rubye was invited to go, mainly to meet up with two pen pals, Millie and Dolly Good (The Girls of the Golden West). While in Chicago, she auditioned for a crooner's role. However, she began laughing halfway through the song. The producer on hand fell in love with her "giggle" and auditioned her instead at WLS-AM for a group called the Prairie Ramblers. Blevins and the Ramblers became regulars on WLS's National Barn Dance program. The Prairie Ramblers also backed Blevins on most of her hits with ARC Records, Decca, and RCA Victor.

In 1934, Blevins' repertoire included "Montana Plains", a reworking of a song originally called "Texas Plains".  Blevins further altered the composition, which became her signature song, "I Want to Be a Cowboy's Sweetheart".  Released in 1935, the song made Blevins the first female country recording artist to have a million seller. It was awarded a gold disc by the RIAA. Blevins performed on National Barn Dance until the 1950s, and worked with  Gene Autry, Pat Buttram, Red Foley, the Girls of the Golden West and George Gobel.

Blevins took her stage name from silent film star and world-champion roper, Monte Montana, with whom she had an opportunity to work early in her career. She made one feature-length movie called Colorado Sunset with Smiley Burnette and Gene Autry.

Barn Dance also introduced her to her future husband, Paul E. Rose. Rose was a stage manager for Gene Autry at the time, and was always around when Autry was performing, which just so happened to be when Patsy was performing. According to Patsy (as she was by this time called by everyone who knew her), they were the "only two single people involved with the show and kinda got thrown together." Though Rose was around five years her junior, they married on July 3, "honeymooned," and July 4 went their separate ways on different tours. Two weeks later they were again united, but throughout their married life they often followed this pattern. The couple had two daughters, Beverly and Judy. Montana and her two daughters later appeared as the Patsy Montana Trio.

After semi-retiring in the late 1950s to spend more time with her family, Montana attempted a comeback in 1964. She released an album on the Sims label in Arizona, notable for having Waylon Jennings as lead guitar player before he made his national debut. The album was later re-released by Starday Records. She influenced later singers Patsy Cline and Dottie West, and more recently, Western music star Devon Dawson, the singing voice of Toy Story 2's Jessie the Yodeling Cowgirl.

Montana's signature song, "I Want to Be a Cowboy's Sweetheart", appears over the end credits of John Sayles's 1996 film Lone Star, which was released just weeks after Montana's death.

Montana died on May 3, 1996, at her home in San Jacinto, California. As Paul Rose served in the United States Army, she is buried at Riverside National Cemetery in Riverside, California. She was inducted into the National Cowgirl Museum and Hall of Fame in Fort Worth, Texas, in 1987 and in the Country Music Hall of Fame in Nashville, Tennessee, in 1996.

Awards

  National Cowgirl Museum and Hall of Fame 1987
  Academy of Country Music Award: Cliffie Stone Pioneer Award 1970
  Western Music Association Hall of Fame 1989
  Cowboy Spirit Awards 1992
  Arizona Country Music Hall of Fame 1994
  the arizona country association pioneer awards 1993
  Country Music Hall of Fame 1996
  Arkansas Country Music Awards 2019 
  Arkansas entertainers hall of fame posthumous awards 1996

See also
 Western music (North America)

References

External links
 Patsy Montana at the Country Music Hall of Fame and Museum
 [ Patsy Montana biography at allmusic.com]
 Patsy Montana at the Rockabilly Hall of Fame
 Patsy Montana at the Western Music Association
 
  – for the niche which contains both remains

1908 births
1996 deaths
American country singer-songwriters
American women country singers
Burials at Riverside National Cemetery
Country musicians from Arkansas
Country Music Hall of Fame inductees
Decca Records artists
People from Garland County, Arkansas
People from Hope, Arkansas
RCA Victor artists
Vocalion Records artists
Yodelers
20th-century American singers
Singer-songwriters from Arkansas
People from San Jacinto, California
Cowgirl Hall of Fame inductees
20th-century American women singers
Singer-songwriters from California